Jiao Ge (Chinese:  (胶鬲); Pinyin: Jiāo Gé) was an official of Shang dynasty.

Plot in Fengshen Yanyi
Jiao Ge is a Grand Counselor that has been serving under the renowned Shang dynasty for many a year. Once King Zhou had unleashed a certain edict to create a large pit of spiders and snakes as to feed the seventy-one remaining maidens for holding on to their original Queen, Jiao Ge would decide it best to discuss the issue with Prince Huang Feihu.

Once the maidens began to be thrown into the pit, Jiao Ge would immediately present himself before King Zhou and wished for an answer. During Jiao Ge's anger, he would continuously blabber on at the king that killing his own people is equivalent to that of slicing of your own arms and legs. Once the king's anger was well exploded, he ordered that Jiao Ge would be thrown into the pit as well. These would be the last words of Jiao Ge before throwing himself over the Star-Picking Belvedere, "You no good bird-brain! Your name will be stinking with cruelty for thousands of years!" Thus immediately following this, other random officials would watch in horror as another loyal official killed himself for the sake of his kingdom.

Jiao Ge was appointed as the deity of Zoushu Star (奏书星) in the end.

Notes

References
 Investiture of the Gods chapter 17
 Lüshi Chunqiu'', Vol.3 and 12

Investiture of the Gods characters
Shang dynasty politicians
Year of birth unknown
Year of death unknown